Podolany  is a village in the administrative district of Gmina Gdów, within Wieliczka County, Lesser Poland Voivodeship, in southern Poland.

The village has a population of 170.

References

Podolany